The peso was a currency of Ecuador until 1884.

History
Peso was the name of the 8 real coins circulating in Ecuador since the Spanish colonial period. In 1856, the currency was pegged to the French franc, with 1 peso = 5 francs. From 1862, paper money was issued denominated in reales and pesos. The peso was formally adopted as the currency of Ecuador in 1871, replacing the real at a rate of 1 peso = 8 reales. It was subdivided into 100 centavos. In 1884, the peso was replaced by the sucre at par.

Coins
The only coins issued between 1871 and 1884 were 1 and 2 centavos, struck in cupro-nickel at the Heaton mint in Birmingham. These coins continued to circulate after the sucre was adopted.

Banknotes
Paper money was only issued by private banks. The Banco Particular de Descuento I Circulación de Guayaquil issued notes between 1862 and 1866 in denominations of 2 and 4 reales, 1, 5, 10, 20, 50 and 100 pesos. The Banco del Ecuador issued denominations of 2 and 4 reales, 1, 4, 5 and 10 pesos between 1868 and 1887. Some 1 and 5 peso notes were later overprinted for use as 80 centavo and 4 sucre notes, due to a conversion rate of 5 pesos = 4 sucres for the notes of this bank.

The Banco de Circulación y Descuento issued 4 real and 1, 4, 5, 10 and 20 peso notes in the 1860s, whilst the Banco Nacional issued notes in the 1870s in denominations of 2 and 4 reales, 1, 5, 10, 20 and 100 pesos. The Banco de Quito issued notes in denominations of 2 reales, 1, 5, 10, 20 and 100 pesos between 1874 and 1880, the Banco de la Unión issued notes between 1882 and 1893 in denominations of 1, 5, 10, 20 and 100 pesos, and the Banco Anglo-Ecuatoriano issued notes in 1884 for 1, 5 and 10 pesos.

See also

Ecuadorian real
Ecuadorian sucre
Economy of Ecuador

References

External links
 

Modern obsolete currencies
Currencies of Ecuador
1884 disestablishments
Economic history of Ecuador